Where Has Love Gone? may refer to:

 Where Has Love Gone? (film) or Gde ty, lyubov'?, a 1980 Soviet film
 Where Has Love Gone? (album), a soundtrack album from the film, or the title song, by Sofia Rotaru
 "Where Has Love Gone?" (song), a song by Holly Johnson

See also 
 Where Love Has Gone (disambiguation)